El Gouna Football Club, is an Egyptian association football club based in El Gouna, Hurghada, Egypt. The club currently plays in the Egyptian Premier League, the highest league in the Egyptian football league system.

History
The club's first league season was in the Egyptian Fourth Division in 2003–04, where they achieved their first title and secured the promotion to the Egyptian Third Division. In the next season of the Third Division, 2004–05, El Gouna accomplished the same feat and promoted to the Egyptian Second Division. In the 2008–09 season of the Second Division the club managed to promote to the Egyptian Premier League for the first time in the club's history.

The team ended the 2017-18 campaign finishing top of the Egyptian Second Division (Group A) after their 1–0 away win against Al Salam on 11 April 2018. El Gouna will play in the Premier League for the fifth time in the club's history, having played four seasons in the top flight before with the 2014–15 season being the most recent.

Records and statistics

Players

Current squad

Out on loan

Managers
 Ismail Youssef (November 1, 2007 – October 2, 2010)
 Anwar Salama (October 10, 2010 – April 12, 2013)
 Rainer Zobel (April 12, 2013 – July 12, 2015)
 Stefan Florian Rieger (June 1, 2016 – December 31, 2016)
 Hesham Zakareya (July 1, 2017 – November 27, 2018)
 Hamada Sedki (November 28, 2018 – June 30, 2019)
 Reda Shehata (June 30, 2019 – July 9, 2019) (Caretaker)
 Nebojša Milošević (July 9, 2019 – 10 December 2019)
 Reda Shehata (10 December 2019 – 25 December 2019) (Caretaker)
 Pedro Barny (27 December 2019 – 14 September 2020)
 Reda Shehata (14 September 2020 – Present)

External links
Official Website

 
Egyptian Second Division
Association football clubs established in 2003
2003 establishments in Egypt